Wyoming Highway 223 (WYO 223) is a  east–west state highway known as Terry Ranch Road in extreme southern Laramie County south of Cheyenne in the southeastern part of the U.S. state of Wyoming. The highway is the former routing of U.S. Route 87 before it was relocated onto Interstate 25.

Route description
Wyoming Highway 223 starts its western end at exit 2 of Interstate 25/U.S. Route 87 southwest of Cheyenne, approximately 2 miles from the Colorado State Line. Highway 223 exits onto an I-25 frontage road but quickly turns left onto Terry Ranch Road and travels to its eastern end at US 85 (South Greeley Highway). WYO 223 serves as a connector between the I-25 and US 85 and serves the residential areas near its eastern end at US 85. Westbound, this route is also signed as "To Interstate 25."

History
Wyoming Highway 223 was once part of the original routing of US 87 south of Cheyenne. US 87 entered from Colorado and followed present day WYO 223 prior to its realignment along Interstate 25. US 87 then met with US 85, at Highway 223's eastern terminus, to head north into Cheyenne.

Major intersections

References

External links

Cheyenne @ AARoads.com
Wyoming State Routes 200-299
WYO 223 - I-25/US 87 to US 85

223
Transportation in Laramie County, Wyoming
223
U.S. Route 87